Shahmaran is a Turkish fantasy-drama Netflix series directed by Umur Turagay and written by Pınar Bulut. The show, which stars Serenay Sarıkaya and Burak Deniz in the lead roles, was released on 20 January 2023.

Synopsis
Şahsu, a psychology lecturer from Istanbul, goes to Adana for work and decides to confront her grandfather, who abandoned her mother many years ago.
While there, she becomes involved with a community that worships Şahmaran, a mythical creature that is half woman, half snake, who are waiting for the completion of a historical prophecy. Her life is transformed when she meets a mysterious man named Maran.

Cast and characters
 Serenay Sarıkaya as Şahsu
 Almina Günaydın as young Şahsu
 Burak Deniz as Maran
 Mustafa Uğurlu as Davut
 Mahir Günşiray as Ural
 Mert Ramazan Demir as Cihan
 Hakan Karahan as Lakmu
 Elif Nur Kerkük as Medine
 Mehmet Bilge Aslan as Salih
 Berfu Halisdemir as Diba
 Nilay Erdönmez as Hare
 Nil Sude Albayrak as Bike
 Öznur Serçeler as Gül
 Ebru Özkan as Çavgeş

Episodes

Reception
Three days after its release, the series had been watched a total of 17 million hours worldwide.

A critic at Cumhuriyet praised the cinematography and actors but was disappointed with the "dissonance" between the "reality of the region" and the characters' behaviour, citing excessive nudity and out-of-context scenes that do not match the old Turkish traditions of the region they were filmed in. The critic also likened Maran's family to the Cullens in Twilight.

References

External links
 
 

2020s Turkish television series
2020s Turkish television series debuts
Turkish drama television series
Turkish-language Netflix original programming
Turkish fantasy television series